Harilal Harshadrai Dhruv (10 May 1856 – 19 June 1896) was a lawyer, poet, editor, indologist and scholar of Sanskrit literature. Educated in Arts and Law, he served as a teacher and later as a judge of Baroda state. He was interested in oriental studies. He wrote poetry and edited some works too.

Life
Dhruv was born in Hindu Nagar Brahmin family in 1856. He completed his Bachelor of Arts in 1873 and LL.B in 1880.  Dhruv worked as a teacher from 1881 to 1885. Later he started his law career as a pleader from Surat, and was elevated to post of District and Session Judge of Baroda state. He was sent as a representative of Bharuch in the annual session of Indian National Congress in 1898 by Baroda state.

In 1882, Dhruv founded Prajahita Vardhak Sabha in Surat with Ukabhai Parabhudas. He left by SS. Maria Theresa and attended the eighth International Congress of Orientalists at Stockholm and Christiania as representative of Baroda in 1889 where he was honoured with Doctor of Literature and Arts. He was a member of the Royal Asiatic Society and the Anthropological Society of London.  Dhruv received Ph.D. from Berlin University. His brother Keshavlal Dhruv was also author, editor and translator. He died in 1896.

Works
His initial poetry was influenced by medieval Gujarati, medieval Hindi and classical Sanskrit poetry while his later poetry was influenced by English poetry and modernism.

Kunjavihara and Pravasapushpanjali are the collections of poems. Kunjavihara has section of patriotic songs titled Swadesh Bhakti. Aharmimansa, Aryotkarsha Vyayog, Laghu Chanakya, Vasant Vilasija, Prana Gujarati Sahitya Ratnamala are his other works.

Bibliography

See also 

 List of Gujarati-language writers

References

Gujarati-language writers
19th-century Indian lawyers
Indian editors
Indian male poets
Indian Indologists
Indian Sanskrit scholars
1896 deaths
1856 births
19th-century Indian journalists
Indian male journalists
19th-century Indian male writers
Poets from Gujarat
Journalists from Gujarat
Scholars from Gujarat